The Most Incredible Thing is the score for the 2011 ballet of the same name, based on the eponymous 1870 fairy tale by Danish author Hans Christian Andersen. It contains music written and performed by Neil Tennant and Chris Lowe of English synth-pop duo Pet Shop Boys. The album was released on 14 March 2011 by Parlophone.

Background
Tennant and Lowe proposed Andersen's story (about a competition in a mythical kingdom where the King announces that whoever invents the most incredible thing will win the hand of the Princess in marriage and half of the Kingdom) as the basis for a new ballet to Sadler's Wells Theatre in London in 2007 after a friend, the then-Royal Ballet principal, Ivan Putrov, asked Tennant if Pet Shop Boys would consider writing a piece of music for him to dance to at Sadler's Wells. Coincidentally a couple of days later, Lowe suggested to Tennant that "The Most Incredible Thing" would make an excellent narrative for a ballet and, inspired by this synchronicity, they approached Sadler's Wells with the project. The following year, Javier de Frutos was chosen as the choreographer and Matthew Dunster wrote a scenario for ballet ("a map for music"). Tennant and Lowe composed most of Act One in autumn 2008 and the rest of the score in 2010. They approached Sven Helbig to write the orchestrations. These were recorded in late 2010 in the Concert Hall of Polish Radio with the Wrocław Score Orchestra conducted by Dominic Wheeler.

Tennant and Lowe said, "This is a very exciting project to be part of. In the past we have written dance music so to write music for a ballet seems like a logical development. Also we have always been fascinated by giving our music a theatrical context."

Tour
After four public preview performances, "The Most Incredible Thing" had its official opening on 21 March 2011 at Sadler's Wells in London. Performances continued until 26 March, and all tickets were sold out. "The Most Incredible Thing" returned to Sadler's Wells in 2012 for 15 performances, from 25 March to 7 April, prior to going on tour to several UK cities. The entire production was filmed by the BBC and broadcast on BBC Four on 1 July 2011.

Limited edition
An exclusive, limited art edition—with 500 copies available worldwide, each hand-numbered and signed by the Pet Shop Boys—was released in May 2011. Designed by Mark Farrow, this release features music and artwork exclusive to The Vinyl Factory's edition.

A silk cloth-bound hardboard slipcase contains a hardback book with seven record sleeves. Six of these house heavyweight 180-gram vinyl records pressed on the EMI 1400. The records feature the Pet Shop Boys' music for the ballet, as well as the original demo versions of each of the compositions, only available in this release. The seventh sleeve contains an oversized foldout sheet music print, signed by Tennant and Lowe. The ballet's synopsis is printed onto the record sleeves so that each has an accompanying narrative that reads like a storybook.

Critical reception

The Most Incredible Thing received generally positive reviews from music critics. At Metacritic, which assigns a normalised rating out of 100 to reviews from mainstream publications, the album received an average score of 66, based on seven reviews. The Independents Andy Gill called the album "stylistically wide-ranging" and stated that "this second foray into theatrical composition [...] is vastly more adept [than Closer to Heaven], involving the deft interweaving of electropop and orchestral elements within a series of impressionistic tableaux sketching out the theme of conflict between creativity and destruction." John Garratt of PopMatters opined that "somewhere between Tennant and Lowe's writing and Helbig's arrangements, there are some subtlety interesting things going on here." He continued, "It's doubtful that anyone will be humming the themes of The Most Incredible Thing in the future the way people can hum The Nutcracker today. But Neil Tennant and Chris Lowe sure do know their stuff." Lauren Murphy of The Irish Times noted that the score contains "numerous formal classical interludes, but it's the iconic duo's own distinctive disco/electropop sound that's branded most heavily on this score", adding that "[i]t's off-putting to hear such distinct worlds colliding, but also startling, oddly compelling, and undeniably ambitious." BBC Music critic Tom Hocknell commented that the album's "minimal orchestration never drowns the listener; strings sweep and chords portend, without any track outstaying its welcome." Hocknell also believed that it "doubtlessly works better as a full performance, but as a stand-alone soundtrack has wonderful moments nonetheless."

Alasdair Duncan of Australian music magazine Rave described the album as "well-constructed and enjoyable, suffused with the kind of wit and sophistication you'd expect from Neil Tennant and Chris Lowe, even if the lack of context means that it sometimes just drifts by in an agreeable haze." Matthew Laidlow of Virgin Media expressed that "[p]eople might be disappointed with the lack of vocals from Neil Tennant, but you have to remember that this isn't a Pet Shop Boys album, instead a successful collaboration that is on par with material they've previously released." AllMusic's David Jeffries viewed that "any fans who found the duo's Battleship Potemkin soundtrack compelling will find this a welcome, lighter alternative, seeing as how the sound is another mashing of Russian classical music and synth pop", concluding that the album is "[o]f limited appeal, but appealing nonetheless". Ben Hogwood of musicOMH remarked, "For sure there are plot signposts, when themes transfer unexpectedly from floated euro trance to orchestral swing, but without a synopsis or a visual guide these transfers can prove unsettling and sometimes clunky." Hogwood did, however, state that "there is some music of great beauty here." In a review for The A.V. Club, Marc Hawthorne felt that "while there are some synth surges and gay-disco thumps over the course of this predominantly instrumental 82-minute orchestral score [...] it doesn't really line up with what's expected of Tennant and Lowe." He also critiqued, "Even more problematic is that the music, while ambitious and appropriately dramatic, hardly approaches standalone greatness." The Observers Hermione Hoby was unimpressed, writing, "The ballet that Tennant and Chris Lowe have scored [...] is based on a story by Hans Christian Andersen rather than George Lucas, but ominous melodrama prevails nonetheless, even when it comes via disco rather than dense orchestration. It's hard not to wonder what the dancers might be doing to all this and, as with Tennant's voice (which makes only a brief appearance), their absence is frustrating."

Track listing
All tracks written and composed by Neil Tennant and Chris Lowe.

Disc one

Disc two

Personnel
Credits adapted from the liner notes of The Most Incredible Thing.

 Pet Shop Boys – performance, production, design, art direction, booklet scenario and background
 Wrocław Score Orchestra – performance
 Dominic Wheeler – conducting
 Sven Helbig – production, orchestrations
 Chris Lowe – programming
 Pete Gleadall – programming
 Bartek Bober – concertmaster
 Joris Bartsch Buhle – contractor
 Andreas Gundlach – piano on "Help Me"
 Teldex Studio Berlin – orchestra recording
 Tobias Lehmann – sound engineering, editing
 Tom Russbüldt – Pro Tools engineering
 Dietrich Zöllner – copyist
 Jan-Peter Klöpfel – copyist
 Bob Kraushaar – mixing 
 Farrow – design, art direction, cover illustration

Charts

Notes

References

External links
 The Most Incredible Thing at Pet Shop Boys' official website

2011 soundtrack albums
Parlophone soundtracks
Pet Shop Boys albums